Mount Nemesis is a mountain, 790 m, which lies 2 nautical miles (3.7 km) northeast of the seaward extremity of Roman Four Promontory and close north of Neny Fjord, on the west coast of Graham Land. First surveyed in 1936 by the British Graham Land Expedition (BGLE) under Rymill. The name is believed to have been given by members of the United States Antarctic Service (USAS), 1939–41.

Mountains of Graham Land
Fallières Coast